Mwampule Masule (born 14 August 1991) is a Motswana professional footballer who plays as a goalkeeper for the Botswana national team and is currently a free agent. He last played for Botswana Premier League club Orapa United.

Mwampule began his career with Division One side Ferry Wanderers in 2007 before moving to Kazungula Young Fighters the following season. Soon after he was signed by Botswana Premier League giants Township Rollers, immediately helping them win the double. Masule stayed nine years with the Gaborone-based club, winning seven league titles, one FA Cup and two Mascom Top 8 cups. He signed for South African outfit Chippa United in the middle of the 2018–19 season but was released less than six months later without making a single appearance for the club. Masule then returned to the Botswana Premier League with Orapa United but was again released. He has been without a club since.

International career
Masule made his debut on 5 March 2014 under Peter Butler in a friendly against South Sudan, which Botswana went on to win 3–0.

Honours

Club
 Township Rollers
Botswana Premier League:7
2009-10, 2010-11, 2013-14, 2015-16, 2016-17, 2017-18, 2018-19
Botswana FA Cup:1
2010
Mascom Top 8 Cup:1
2017-18

Individual
Botswana Premier League Player of the Season: 2014
Botswana Premier League Supporters' Player of the Season: 2014
 Mascom Top 8 Cup Goalkeeper of the Tournament: 2014

References

External links
 
 

1991 births
Living people
Botswana footballers
Botswana international footballers
Association football goalkeepers
Township Rollers F.C. players
Chippa United F.C. players
Orapa United F.C. players
Botswana expatriate footballers
Expatriate soccer players in South Africa
Botswana expatriate sportspeople in South Africa